Satakunta (or Satagundia) is a historical province of Finland. It borders the historical provinces of Finland Proper, Tavastia and Ostrobothnia, also the Gulf of Bothnia.

Historical Satakunta is situated on the areas of modern provinces of Satakunta and the most of Pirkanmaa, also little areas of Central Finland and Southern Ostrobothnia.

Historical provinces of Finland
Satakunta
Western Finland Province